Vilaplana is a municipality in the comarca of Baix Camp, Tarragona, Catalonia, Spain.

Vilaplana may also refer to:

People
Antonio Vilaplana Molina (1926–2010), Catholic bishop of the Diocese of León, Spain
Bernat Vilaplana, Spanish film editor
Lilo Vilaplana, Cuban director, screenwriter and teacher

Others
Casa Vilaplana, a building in Alcoy, Alicante, Valencian Community, Spain